Marta Pan (12 June 1923, Budapest — 12 October 2008, Paris) was a French abstract sculptor of Hungarian origin.

Early life
Marta Pan was born in Budapest, Hungary in 1923. She studied art at the Ecole des Beaux-Arts in Budapest.

Work
Pan's sculptures are highly concerned with balance, symmetry, and geometry. She often created her works so that they were site-specific and worked with the surrounding environment.  In 1946 Pan moved to Paris, where she met Constantin Brâncuşi and Fernand Léger. In 1952 she married André Wogenscky, who was a studio assistant to Le Corbusier. Her early sculptures were highly influenced by the architecture of Le Corbusier. In 1956, Pan created Le Teck, which consisted of two moveable parts. The choreographer Maurice Béjart later created a ballet, also entitled Le Teck, inspired directly by Pan's sculpture. Béjart's ballet was premiered on the roof of Le Corbusier's Unité d'Habitation building in Marseille, France. Until 1960, all of Pan's sculptures consisted of this two-part construction method, which allowed one piece to be moved, thus altering the work.
In 1990 she made Celle floating sculpture in Italy for the Gori collection - Fattoria di Celle.

Death
Pan died on 12 October 2008 in Paris, France.

Public collections
Pan's work can be seen in a number of public institutions and locations, including:
 Floating Sculpture (1973), Dallas City Hall, Dallas (Texas), USA
 Sculpture flottante, Otterlo (1960), Kröller-Müller Museum, Otterlo, Netherlands
 La Perspective (1992), Musée de la Ville de Saint-Quentin-en-Yvelines (Yvelines, Île-de-France), France
 Floating Sculpture No. 3 (1972), Lynden Sculpture Garden,  Milwaukee (Wisconsin), USA
 Signe infini (1993), intersection of autoroutes A46 and A6 at Ambérieux (Rhône, Rhône-Alpes), France.
 Celle Floating Sculpture (1990), Collezione Gori Fattoria di Celle - Collezione Gori, Italy

Recognition
In 2001 Pan was awarded the prestigious Praemium Imperiale award for Sculpture from the Japan Art Society.

Selected works

References

Further reading 
 "Pan, Marta." In Grove Art Online. Oxford Art Online, (accessed February 22, 2012; subscription required).

External links 

 Entry for Marta Pan on the Union List of Artist Names

1923 births
2008 deaths
20th-century Hungarian sculptors
21st-century Hungarian sculptors
20th-century Hungarian women artists
21st-century Hungarian women artists
French women sculptors
Hungarian women sculptors
Artists from Budapest
Recipients of the Praemium Imperiale
20th-century French sculptors
20th-century French women artists
21st-century French sculptors
21st-century French women artists